William Thompson Bagley (born June 29, 1928) is an American politician in the state of California.

Biography
Bagley served in the California Assembly as a Republican from 1960 to 1974, representing Marin and Sonoma Counties (then, Assembly District 7). From 1989 to 2002, Bagley served as a member of the University of California Board of Regents and in 2002, was named Alumnus of the Year by the California Alumni Association. In 1987, the stretch of California Highway 101 from the Robin Williams (née Waldo) Tunnel to San Rafael was named the William T. Bagley Freeway. He is the author of California's Golden Years: When Government Worked and Why.

He also served as a member of the Commodity Futures Trading Commission from April 15, 1975 - April 15, 1980 and as Chairman for the commission from April 15, 1975 - November 15, 1978

References

1928 births
Living people
UC Berkeley School of Law alumni
People from San Rafael, California
Republican Party members of the California State Assembly
Commodity Futures Trading Commission personnel
Ford administration personnel
Carter administration personnel